The Tongan ground dove (Pampusana stairi), also known as the shy ground dove or friendly ground dove, is a species of bird in the family Columbidae.
It is found in American Samoa, Fiji, Samoa, Tonga and Wallis and Futuna Islands. 
Its natural habitat is subtropical or tropical moist lowland forests. 
It is threatened by habitat loss.

This species was formerly in the genus Alopecoenas Sharpe, 1899, but the name of the genus was changed in 2019 to Pampusana Bonaparte, 1855 as this name has priority.

References

External links
BirdLife Species Factsheet.

Tongan ground dove
Birds of Tonga
Birds of the Pacific Ocean
Tongan ground dove
Tongan ground dove
Taxonomy articles created by Polbot
Taxobox binomials not recognized by IUCN